Isonema is a genus of plant in the family Apocynaceae first described as a genus in 1810. It is native to Africa.

Species
 Isonema buchholzii Engl. - Nigeria, Cameroon 
 Isonema infundibuliflorum Stapf - Cameroon, Gabon, Zaire 
 Isonema smeathmannii Roem. & Schult. - W Africa (Ghana, Guinea, Guinea-Bissau, Ivory Coast, Liberia, Senegal, Sierra Leone)

References

 
Apocynaceae genera